The Tunku Abdul Rahman Foundation is a non-profit public foundation incorporated by an Act of Parliament in 1966. The primary aim of the foundation is to recognise and encourage the development of youths who show excellence in both academic and extra-curricular pursuits through the provision of scholarships for higher education.

History
On the occasion of the 63rd birthday of the first Prime Minister of Malaysia, Tunku Abdul Rahman, on 8 February 1966, the Malay language newspaper, Utusan Melayu, launched a fund-raising exercise to set up a proposed education fund to provide for the higher education of Malay youths. Initially named the Tunku Abdul Rahman Education Fund, it gained the support of a broad segment of Malaysian society.

As a result, the federal government of Malaysia decided to formally establish a national foundation and open the fund to Malaysian applicants regardless of their ethnicity or creed. This was made possible with the passage of the Tunku Abdul Rahman Foundation Fund Act 1966 by Parliament on 28 July 1966.

Mohd Khir Johari was appointed as the first chairman of the board of trustees upon the establishment of the foundation. On 16 April 1974, the cabinet decided that the seat of the chairman would be held by the office of the Minister of Education. On 26 March 2004 the jurisdiction of the foundation was transferred from the Ministry of Education to the newly devolved Ministry of Higher Education.

Disbursements, awards and prizes

Tunku Abdul Rahman Foundation Scholarship 
The scholarship (not to be mistaken with other Tunku Abdul Rahman scholarships) was established in 2006 to replace a previous financial aid program that was in the form of a loan.

The awarding of the scholarship is the main endowment by the foundation and is open for applications annually. Applications for the scholarship is open to academically outstanding Malaysian undergraduates below 25 years of age who meet specific criteria set by the foundation.

Recipients of this scholarship are known as Tunku Scholars.

After several batch of scholarship recipients, Tunku Scholars Association Malaysia was established to foster a network and bonding among current scholarship recipients and alumni. More information can be found on the Association's official website.

Tunku Abdul Rahman Chair of International Law
On 5 January 1985, the foundation gave an endowment of RM 1,000,000 to the University of Malaya to establish an academic chair in the Faculty of Law. This became known as the Tunku Abdul Rahman Chair of International Law. In June 1985, the Senate of the University of Malaya appointed Ian Campbell MacGibbon as the first holder of the chair. The next Tunku Abdul Rahman Professor of International Law was Herbert Victor Morais. In 2016 the Chair was renamed. The current holder is Emeritus Professor Datuk Dr Hj Shad Saleem Faruqi who was appointed in February 2017.

Other awards and prizes
Apart from the two main disbursements described above, the foundation also grants the following awards and prizes:

Tunku Abdul Rahman Medal
This award is in the form of a gold medal, a certificate, and a unit trust certificate from Amanah Saham Gemilang worth RM 3,000 awarded to one graduate from a local institution of higher education annually. Nominations are received from the respective institutions and selected based on specific criteria set by the foundation.

Tunku Abdul Rahman Foundation Academic Prize
This was a cash prize of RM 500 awarded to the best first year undergraduate student of the Faculty of Human Ecology a Universiti Putra Malaysia. The prize is no longer awarded.

Tunku Abdul Rahman Higher Degree Scholarship
This was a scholarship awarded to academically excellent students intending to pursue postgraduate education. The awarding of this scholarship is currently suspended.

Governance
The foundation is governed by a board of trustees made up of the following:

 The Minister of Higher Education as chairman
 One representative from the Ministry of Higher Education
 One representative from the Federal Treasury of Malaysia
 Six members appointed by the chairman
 The Chief Executive of the foundation

See also

 Ministry of Higher Education (Malaysia)
 Scholarship
 Philanthropy
 Social responsibility

External links
 Tunku Abdul Rahman Foundation

References

Educational organisations based in Malaysia
Foundations based in Malaysia
Educational foundations
Educational charities
Organizations established in 1966
1966 establishments in Malaysia
Organisations based in Putrajaya